Local Government Yorkshire and Humber (LGYH) was the partnership of local authorities, including fire, police and national park authorities, across Yorkshire and Humber. It had links to the Local Government Association at national level and incorporated the regional employers organisation for Yorkshire and Humber.

It brought local authorities together on key issues, supported the improvement of service delivery, influenced Government on the future of local government, promoted good employment practices, and worked with local authorities to improve the public perception and understanding of local government.

Local Government Yorkshire and Humber closed in March 2015.

References

External links
Local Government Yorkshire and Humber

Local government in Yorkshire and the Humber
Local authority leaders' boards in England
Local Government Association
Regional employers organisations